Fortunato Arena (23 May 1922 – 7 March 1994) was an Italian stuntman and actor. He appeared in more than one hundred films from 1954 to 1989.

Selected filmography
 Blood for a Silver Dollar (1965)
 Conqueror of Atlantis (1965)
 008: Operation Exterminate (1965)
 Erik, the Viking (1965)
 Seven Dollars on the Red (1966)
 Django Shoots First (1966)
 Killer's Carnival (1966)
 The Great Silence (1968)
 Long Days of Hate (1968)
 Day After Tomorrow (1968)
 Sartana the Gravedigger (1969)
 I quattro del pater noster (1969)
 I Am Sartana, Trade Your Guns for a Coffin (1970)
 Adiós, Sabata (1970)
 The Last Traitor (1971)
 Trinity Is Still My Name (1971)
 Shoot the Living and Pray for the Dead (1971)
 Two Sons of Trinity (1972)
 Who Killed the Prosecutor and Why? (1972)
 Return of Shanghai Joe (1975)
 A Special Cop in Action (1976) 
 Confessions of a Lady Cop (1976)

References

External links 

1922 births
1994 deaths
Italian male film actors